A balloon helicopter is a flying toy consisting of a latex toy balloon and a plastic propeller, derived from the simple balloon rocket. The most important feature is the hollow propeller hub which directs air into a passage in each propeller blade. The air passages channel air to the blade tips such that air escapes in a fine jet tangentially. The air jets on the blade tips causes the entire toy to spin, the blades have a positive angle of attack so the blades experience a lifting force as they push air downwards. It can attain a height of approximately 12 meters (40 feet). Full-scale helicopters have been built around this tip jet configuration.

See also
 Balloon rocket

External links 
  Physics teacher Robert Douglas discusses Newton's Third Law and understanding force pairs with this demonstration using the Balloon Helicopter
  A demonstration video of assembly and launch.

Educational toys
Inflatable manufactured goods